Matilpi is a locality on the Central Coast of British Columbia, Canada, located northeast of Hull Island on the east side of Havannah Channel

Etsekin Indian Reserve No. 1, a.k.a. Etsekin 1, includes Matilpi and adjacent small islands.

The reserve was originally allotted to the Mahteelthpe or Matilpi Tribe, who amalgamated with the Tlowitsis Tribe to create the Tlowitsis-Mumtagila First Nation. It is now under the governance of the Tlowitsis Nation.

See also
List of communities in British Columbia
List of Indian reserves in British Columbia
List of Kwakwaka'wakw villages

References

Unincorporated settlements in British Columbia
Kwakwaka'wakw villages
Central Coast of British Columbia